Vsevolod Nestayko (30 January 1930 – 16 August 2014) was a modern Ukrainian children's writer. In Ukraine he is considered the country's best-known and best loved Ukrainian children’s literature writer.

Biography
During World War I Nestayko's parents were on opposite sides of the front. His father was a Sich Riflemen (of the former Austro-Hungarian army) and later a member of the Ukrainian Galician Army; his mother was a teacher of Russian literature and nurse in the Russian Imperial Army. In 1933 his father was killed by the NKVD. To escape the Holodomor famine Nestayko and his mother moved to Kyiv to her sister. Nestayko lived and worked since in Kyiv.

In 1947 he started and in 1952 Nestayko graduated from the Faculty of Philology of the Taras Shevchenko National University of Kyiv. He then worked in the magazine "Dnipro", "Periwinkle" and "Youth". And from 1956 to 1987 Nestayko was the editor in charge of children's literature magazine "Rainbow". Nestayko's first book “Shurka & Shurko” was published in 1956. From then till his death circa 30 of his stories, fairy tales, novels and plays were published. His books have been translated into twenty languages throughout the world, including English, German, French, Spanish, Russian, Arabic, Bengali, Hungarian, Romanian, Bulgarian, and Slovak. The adaptation of Nestayko's Toreadors from Vasyukivka won a Grand-prix at the International Festival in Munich (in 1968) and the main prize in Sydney (in 1969). The Fraud ”F” adaptation was awarded at the All-Soviet Union Film Festival in Kyiv (in 1984) and at the Gabrovo Film Festival (in Bulgaria in 1985). Nestayko's works are included in school curricula in Ukraine.

In 2010 Viktor Yushchenko awarded him an order of Prince Yaroslav the Wise of fifth class.

On January 30, 2015, Google celebrated his 85th birthday with a Google Doodle.

References

1930 births
2014 deaths
Burials at Baikove Cemetery
Ukrainian children's writers
Soviet children's writers
Soviet male writers
20th-century male writers
People from Berdychiv
20th-century Ukrainian writers
21st-century Ukrainian writers